The 2020 Memphis 901 FC season is the second season for Memphis 901 FC in the USL Championship (USL-C), the second-tier professional soccer league in the United States and Canada. This article covers the period from November 18, 2019, the day after the 2019 USL-C Playoff Final, to the conclusion of the 2020 USL-C Playoff Final, scheduled for November 12–16, 2020.

Season in review

Background, off-season and pre-season
Memphis finished their inaugural season of 2019 in 15th place among the 18-team eastern conference, five spots below the playoff positions, although they did enter the final week of the regular season with a mathematical chance of making the playoffs. The club announced in November that nine players, mostly starters, from the inaugural season would be retained for the 2020 campaign. In January, the club announced that minority owner Tim Howard would be taking on the role of Sporting Director. Beginning in mid-January, the club announced several player signings: defenders Zach Carroll and Mark Segbers, midfielders Rafael Mentzingen, Michael Reed, and Jean-Christophe Koffi, UK League One-experienced winger Keanu Marsh-Brown, and goalkeeper Jimmy Hague. In early February, the club announced their pre-season schedule, with exhibitions scheduled against clubs from the USL Championship and League One, as well as NCAA Divisions I and III.

The club began its preseason campaign by dropping a match 2–1 away to Saint Louis FC on February 8. The second preseason match on February 22 produced a 3–1 win over USL League One side Forward Madison. The preseason campaign was finished on February 29 with a 1–0 win against the NCCA D-I University of Memphis men's team.

On March 4, in the run-up to the season opener, the club announced that minority owner and sporting director Tim Howard was coming out of retirement to play in goal.

March
In their season opener in front of a record crowd, the club went up 2-0 after only 16 minutes, then conceded four unanswered goals through the remainder of the match to fall 4–2 to Indy. In response to the COVID-19 pandemic, the league suspended play for 30 days beginning March 12. On March 19, the suspension was further extended to May 10.

June
On June 4, the league announced a tentative date of July 11 for a resumption of play. Later, the league announced that upon resumption of play, teams would be separated into eight regional groups and play enough matches to complete a 16-game schedule. On June 26, the league announced that Memphis was to be placed into Group G with other regional clubs including Birmingham, Charlotte, and North Carolina.

July
Memphis began their Return To Play campaign in Group G on July 15 with a 0–3 loss on the road at Birmingham. Despite dominating first-half possession with 64%, Memphis conceded three goals before the half-time break. Three days later, the club secured its first point of the season with a 2–2 draw away to Atlanta United 2. The tie was secured by a stoppage time goal from Cal Jennings in only his second professional appearance. In their first home match after the Return To Play restart, the club secured another point with another 2–2 draw versus Charlotte.

August
Memphis began the month by scoring their first competitive win of the season at home versus St. Louis. Keanu Marsh-Brown scored the go-ahead goal in the 54th minute, with the defense protecting the lead by limiting St. Louis to one shot on goal through the remainder of the match. The club finished their 3-match homestand with a 0–1 loss to North Carolina FC. Akeem Ward scored for NCFC in the 38th minute and the team was unable to equalize despite controlling possession with 55% in the 1st half and 56% in the 2nd half. The club followed that performance with a draw on the road against group leaders Birmingham. 901 held a 2–1 lead onwards from the 28th minute, but the Legion earned a penalty kick in stoppage time to claim a draw. The club's final match of the month away to North Carolina was postponed in the midst of the reactions to the shooting of Jacob Blake in Kenosha, Wisconsin.

September
The club began a busy month of seven matches, six scheduled and one rescheduled, by losing at home to Charlotte 0–2. The match was particularly bad for Keanu Marsh-Brown who failed to convert a penalty kick in the eighth minute, then had a corner kick deflect off of him in the 32nd minute to put Charlotte on the scoreboard with an own goal. Next, 901 earned another point with a draw against group leaders Birmingham, this time at home with each club scoring one goal. The rescheduling of the postponed August 29 match created a situation that had the club playing North Carolina on the road twice in three days. In the first match, Memphis scored their second competitive win of the season by the score of 3–2, courtesy of a stoppage time goal from Matt Hundley. In the second match, Memphis surrendered a two-goal lead for the fourth time during the season in a 2–3 loss.

On September 15 the club announced that inaugural manager Tim Mulqueen was being relieved of his duties, with assistant coach Ben Pirmann stepping in to fill the vacancy in the interim. The team began the post-Mulqueen era with a 4–1 loss away at Louisville. The lone bright spot in the match for 901 was rookie Cal Jennings scoring his third goal in only two matches. Following the postponement of their September 23 match at NCFC, the 901 notched a 3–1 victory away versus Charlotte on the 26th. Despite four internal disciplinary suspensions that left the team with only three available substitutes, another Cal Jennings brace of goals propelled them to the victory.

October
Memphis finished their season with another 3–1 victory, at home against Birmingham on this occasion. 901 FC's entire scoring output consisted of a hat trick from Cal Jennings. Due to both Memphis and North Carolina FC being mathematically eliminated from playoff contention, league policy cancelled the clubs' postponed September 23 match, leaving both clubs with fifteen played matches.

Roster

Competitions

Exhibitions

USL Championship

Standings — Group G

Match results
The league announced opening home matches for the season on January 6, 2020. In the preparations for the resumption of league play, the remainder of Memphis' schedule was announced on July 2.

U.S. Open Cup 

As a USL Championship club, Memphis will enter the competition in the Second Round, to be played April 7–9.

Statistics 
 Source: Memphis901FC.com

Numbers after plus-sign(+) denote appearances as a substitute.

Appearances and goals

|-
|}

References

Memphis 901 FC
Memphis 901
Memphis
Memphis 901